Moringa arborea is a species of flowering plant in the family Moringaceae that is endemic to Kenya.

References

Explorelifeonearth.org: Moringa website

arborea
Endemic flora of Kenya
Trees of Africa
Plants described in 1985
Vulnerable plants
Taxonomy articles created by Polbot